Carmen Aguado, Duchesse de Montmorency (née Carmen-Ida-Marie; 28 June 1847 – 26 November 1880) was the only daughter of Alexandre Aguado Moreno and lady-in-waiting Claire Emilie MacDonnel. By marriage to Adalbert de Talleyrand Périgord, Duc de Montmorency, she was the Duchess of Montmorency. Carmen was the subject of a portrait by Franz Xaver Winterhalter.

Life 
Born on 28 June 1847, Carmen-Ida-Marie Aguado was the daughter of Alexandre Aguado and Claire Emilie MacDonnel. Claire was a lady-in-waiting to Eugénie de Montijo, and Alexandre was a patient at a mental asylum. Carmen was their third and last child.

On 2 June 1866, Carmen married Adalbert de Talleyrand-Périgord (1837 – 1915) and henceforth became Duchesse de Montmorency. Their marriage was short-lived, though Carmen was able to give birth to one child:

 Louis de Talleyrand-Périgord (22 March 1867 – 26 September 1951); became Duke of Montmorency.

Carmen died on 26 November 1880, at the age of 33. Her death was most likely the affects of tuberculosis.

Portrait 
In 1860, Carmen was the model for prominent artist Franz Xaver Winterhalter.

References 

1847 births
1880 deaths
19th-century French people